is a train station on the Hankyu Railway Kyoto Line located in Mukō, Kyoto Prefecture, Japan.

Lines
Hankyu Railway Kyoto Line

Layout
The station has two side platforms serving two tracks.

History
On October 1, 1972 when the town of Mukō (Mukō-machi in Japanese) became a city (Mukō-shi in Japanese), the station name was changed to the current one.

In 1978 when the underground passage of the station was constructed, an archaeological excavation at the station found some ruins of Nagaoka-kyō, the capital city of Japan from 784 to 794, and earlier period.

Station numbering was introduced to all Hankyu stations on 21 December 2013 with this station being designated as station number HK-78.

Usage
In fiscal 2014 (April 2014 to March 2015), about 2,254,000 passengers started travel from this station annually. For historical data, see the table below.

Stations next to Nishi-Mukō

References

External links

Hankyu Kyoto Main Line
Railway stations in Kyoto Prefecture
Railway stations in Japan opened in 1928
Mukō